Tatsuo Sasaki may refer to:

, Japanese musician
, Japanese sport wrestler